Manoba melanomedia is a moth in the family Nolidae. It was described by Hiroshi Inoue in 1991. It is found on Borneo and in Taiwan and Thailand. The habitat consists of hill dipterocarp forests and lower montane forests and scrub on limestone.

References

Moths described in 1991
Nolinae